Stannergate railway station served the suburb of Stannergate, Dundee, Scotland from 1901 to 1916 on the Dundee and Arbroath Railway.

History 
The station opened on 1 February 1901 by the Dundee and Arbroath Railway. To the south of the station was a small goods yard which had looped sidings. These served the nearby Tay Oilcake Works. The station closed to both passengers and goods traffic on 1 May 1916. The station buildings were demolished in the 1930s.

References

External links 

Disused railway stations in Dundee
Railway stations in Great Britain opened in 1901
Railway stations in Great Britain closed in 1916
1901 establishments in Scotland
1916 disestablishments in Scotland
Former Dundee and Arbroath Railway stations